Aescwine or Escwine or Æscwine is an Anglo-Saxon name, whose modern descendant is Ashwin. It translates literally as "ash-tree friend", but can mean a number of things, including "strong/manly friend", or "friendly man."

Notable persons with the name include:
Aescwine of Essex (494-587), born in ancient Saxony in northern Germany and in 527 he became king of Essex
Aescwine of Wessex (died circa 676), king of Wessex 

Old English given names
Masculine given names